Darlene Jenise "McCoy" Johnson-Jackson (born October 31, 1971; née, Johnson), is an American gospel singer, songwriter, author, radio personality, and Christian R&B recording artist. She started her music career, in 2005, with the release of Fallen in Love single by EMI Gospel. She would release a precursor extended play, in 2007's Fallen in Love, again with EMI Gospel. This will lead into the release of Darlene McCoy later on that year. This album was her breakthrough release on the Billboard magazine charts, which it placed on the Gospel Albums chart. She is the First African American Female to host a nightly syndicated radio show, as she is the host of Nightly Spirit under Reach Media Inc.

Early life
Darlene was born on October 31, 1971, as Darlene Jenise Johnson, in Greenville, South Carolina, the daughter of William R. Johnson and Sadie Sherman Johnson. They raised her in the church from the time she was born, along with her retired military Air Force brother, Reverend Curtis L. Johnson.

Music career
EMI Gospel signed her to a music contract in 2004. Her solo music career started in 2005, with the release of the single "Fallen in Love", and this released on September 13, 2005, by EMI Gospel. This eventually lead to an extended play being released, Fallen in Love, on April 24, 2007 by EMI Gospel, and this was the precursor to her first studio album. This song was included on the soundtrack of Tyler Perry's Diary of a Mad Black Woman. Darlene released, Darlene McCoy, on May 8, 2007 with label EMI Gospel. This album would be her Billboard magazine breakthrough release on the Gospel Albums chart at No. 22. The album got nominated at the 39th GMA Dove Awards for the Urban Album of the Year, while the song, "Simply Because", was nominated for Urban Recorded Song of the Year. Tony Cummings, indicating in a nine out of ten review by Cross Rhythms, realizes, "All in all, outstanding urban gospel." In 2011, she released a single, "I Shall Live And Not Die"on May 17, 2011, and this charted on the Hot Gospel Songs chart put out by Billboard at No. 21.

Personal life
Darlene McCoy has 3 Children: Ambria Boyd, Chandler "Champp" McCoy, Dylan McCoy and one grandson, Jax Nasir Scott. Darlene is also the first cousin, twice removed of legendary minister/activist Benjamin Mays and comedian/actress Moms Mabley.

Filmography

Film

Discography

Studio albums

References

External links
Official website/

1971 births
Living people
African-American songwriters
African-American Christians
Musicians from Atlanta
Musicians from South Carolina
Songwriters from Georgia (U.S. state)
Songwriters from South Carolina
21st-century African-American people
20th-century African-American people